The Glory and Misery of Human Life is a 1988 Finnish drama film directed and written by Matti Kassila starring Lasse Pöysti, Liisamaija Laaksonen and Tuula Nyman. It is based on the novel by F.E. Sillanpää.

The film is Jasper Pääkkönen's debut role, when he was seven years old at the time. The film also features Samuli Edelmann in one of his first film roles.

Plot
The film is starring writer Martti Hongisto (Lasse Pöysti), who goes out to meet Anna (Liisamaija Laaksonen) after loving her youth and reminiscing about his past youth. Meanwhile, Hongisto's wife Laimi (Tuula Nyman) is searching for her husband in restaurants.

Awards
Jussi 1989:
Best Actress (Liisamaija Laaksonen)
Best Supporting Actress (Tarja Keinänen)
Best Production Design (Ensio Suominen)
Best Original Score (Jukka Linkola)

References

External links 
 

1980s Finnish-language films
1988 drama films
1988 films
Films directed by Matti Kassila
Films based on Finnish novels
Finnish drama films